Carboxybiotin decarboxylase (MadB, carboxybiotin protein decarboxylase) is an enzyme with systematic name carboxybiotinyl-(protein) carboxy-lyase. This enzyme catalyses the following chemical reaction

 a carboxybiotinyl-[protein] + n Na+in + H+out  CO2 + a biotinyl-[protein] + n Na+out (n = 1--2)

This enzyme is an integral membrane protein MadB from the anaerobic bacterium Malonomonas rubra.

Nomenclature

References

External links 
 

EC 4.3.99